Yun Seok-hee (born 21 July 1993) is a South Korean footballer who plays as a forward for Pattani.

He scored the fastest goal in the K League 2 against Bucheon FC after 28 seconds.

Career statistics

Club

References

1993 births
Living people
South Korean footballers
South Korean expatriate footballers
Association football forwards
University of Ulsan alumni
K League 2 players
Goyang Zaicro FC players
South Korean expatriate sportspeople in Thailand
Expatriate footballers in Thailand